Sebastián Martín Benega (born 20 May 1999) is an Argentine professional footballer who plays as a midfielder or left-back for Güemes on loan from Banfield.

Career
Benega began his career with Banfield. Julio César Falcioni moved him into their senior squad for the 2018–19 season, selecting him for the first time on 18 July 2018 during a Copa Argentina defeat to Primera C Metropolitana's General Lamadrid. Less than a month later, on 12 August, Benega made his professional league debut against Rosario Central in the Argentine Primera División.

Career statistics
.

References

External links

1999 births
Living people
People from Lomas de Zamora
Argentine footballers
Association football forwards
Argentine Primera División players
Club Atlético Banfield footballers
Guillermo Brown de Puerto Madryn footballers
Sportspeople from Buenos Aires Province